Bolinger is a surname. Notable people with the surname include:

Bo Bolinger (1932–2011), American football player
Brian Bolinger, American football official
Dwight Bolinger (1907–1992), American linguist
Russ Bolinger (born 1954), American football player, actor, broadcaster, and scout

See also
Bollinger
Boulanger